Tirupathi Express is a 2014 Kannada language romantic comedy film starring Sumanth Shailendra and Kriti Kharbanda. The film was written and directed by P Kumar, produced by Shailendra Babu. The film is an official remake of the Telugu movie Venkatadri Express.

Plot
Srinivas Rao is a strict retired headmaster settled in Mysore. He follows rules strictly want discipline from surrounding ones and also he threw out anyone from his family who commit 100 mistakes. He already threw out his younger brother from home for committing 100 mistake and next one on line is his younger son Sumanth who commits 99 mistakes. Family went to Tirupathi for wedding of Mohana, elder son of Srinivas Rao, while everyone on train Lakshmi, wife of Srinivas Rao remembers she forget Mangala sutra and tells only to her son Sumanth to collect it and catch train because she didn't want commit mistake on her husband way.

On the rush to collect Mangala sutra from Sumanth takes auto annoyingly encounters with Prathana, who also travels to Tirupathi in train. He collect Mangala sutra from home and catch the train, which still on platform  while Prathana thinks sumanth is pretty thief. In train compartment   Sangya Patil hands over his Bag to Sumanth to look safely while he goto washroom. Sumanth jump of the  train to stop petty quarrel in platform with bag and miss the train. Because he enter the quarrel Prathana also miss the train.

Sumanth got to travel next station  in speed and whose driver is drunken Mandya Malya. While travelling to next station Malya start petty fight with local cops and theft cops vehicle and reach train and instead Sumanth, Malya got the train. Sumanth is caught by Police for thefting Police Vehicle. And escape from police after small accident and got bus where Prathana also travels to Tirupathi. After heat in argument passengers kick-out the both from bus. After series of mis-adventure reach outskirts of Tirupathi. Sumanth helps to two love-couple marriage with Mangala sutra without knowing whereabouts of couples and also  he had by rescue from goons who are chasing couples. He thinks he will be kick-out from his family for committing final mistake. On the way he encounters paternal uncle who had been kick-out from family for committing 100 mistakes. He Helps Sumanth to reach final train station on time and give Mangala sutra he had. Everyone from Sumanth family thinks he is in another train compartment on the journey.

On time Wedding time Sumanth find out, he marries the strange girl is actually the bride to-be married by his brother. He tells everything to his mother and she got shocked admits the hospital. After series of events Srinivas Rao admits he was wrong ask everyone for apology. Mohana married Prathana's sister and Srinivas Rao accept his brother.

Cast
 Sumanth Shailendra as Sumanth
 Kriti Kharbanda as Prathana
 Ashok as Srinivas Rao
 Sumithra as Lakshmi, Srinivas Rao wife 
 Naveen Krishna as Mohana
 Kuri Prathap as Sangya Patil
 Chikkanna as Mandya Malya, Auto Driver 
 Sadhu Kokila as Indrajaala
 Bullet Prakash
 Sihi Kahi Chandru as Ticktet Collecter
 Sharath Lohithaswa
 Ninasam Ashwath
 Lakshmi Hegde as Kasturi, Srinivasa Rao daughter 
 Sathyajith as Police Inspector 
 Mandeep Roy as Snake-Charmer
 Sharan as himself, narrator of the movie

Soundtrack

Movie jukebox had 2 songs were composed by Arjun Janya. Auio released under Anand Audio label on 2 July 2014.

References

External links
 

2014 films
2010s Kannada-language films
Indian romantic comedy films
2014 romantic comedy films
Films scored by Arjun Janya
Films shot in Mysore
2014 drama films
Kannada remakes of Telugu films